McLane Stadium is an American football stadium in Waco, Texas owned and operated by Baylor University. Originally named "Baylor Stadium", the facility's name was changed to "McLane Stadium" in December 2013 to honor Baylor alumnus and business magnate Drayton McLane, Jr., who provided the lead gift in the fundraising campaign for the stadium construction.  Baylor's first game at McLane was played August 31, 2014, with the Bears defeating SMU 45–0. The stadium has a capacity of 45,140 spectators and was designed to be expandable to a capacity of 55,000 as future needs require. McLane Stadium replaced Floyd Casey Stadium as the home field for the Baylor Bears football program.

Events
The first college football game in McLane Stadium was a 45–0 Baylor win over SMU, in the 2014 season opener, on August 31, 2014. The Bears followed up their first victory with a 70-6 win over FCS opponent Northwestern State.

In addition to sporting events, Baylor and the city of Waco plan to use the venue to host concerts and other community events such as The Gathering (a local gathering of churches on Palm Sunday). The stadium features the Baylor Club, a dining and event space located on the stadium's west side. The Baylor Club ballroom offers floor-to-ceiling windows overlooking the field and panoramic views of the Brazos River and Waco.

Features
The stadium is located on the north bank of the Brazos River, one of a few major college football stadiums (along with Neyland Stadium, Husky Stadium and Heinz Field) where fans can arrive at the stadium by boat.  Fans can "sailgate" in the Baylor Basin, a cove that adjoins the stadium.

The stadium contains 39 suites, 74 loge boxes, 1,200 outdoor club seats, 3,000 seats for the Baylor Line< student group, and 6,700 total student seats.

Video board
The stadium includes a large high-definition LED video board behind the south end zone. The board has an area of 5,029 square feet, ranking it as the 13th largest college football video board in the nation as of April 2014.

McLane also features ribbon displays around the stadium's horseshoe configuration, measuring 1,254 feet in length. To complement the video board, Baylor released an in-game mobile app that enables fans to stream live footage, watch game replays from a variety of angles, and access current game statistics. To accommodate usage of the app, the stadium is outfitted with free Wi-Fi. The video board from Baylor's previous football stadium, Floyd Casey Stadium, was installed at the university's baseball field, Baylor Ballpark.

Locker room
Baylor constructed a 7,500-square-foot home locker room. Designed as an oval in the shape of a football, the facilities feature over 120 cherry wood lockers. Additionally, the center of the room's ceiling features a large illuminated "BU" logo.

Attendance records

Single game attendance

Season average attendance 

† Limited to 25% capacity due to COVID-19 pandemic

Gallery

See also
 List of NCAA Division I FBS football stadiums

References

External links

 
 McLane Stadium at Baylor Bears (archived)
 Baylor Stadium Construction Lawsuit

Baylor Bears football venues
Sports venues in Waco, Texas
American football venues in Texas
2014 establishments in Texas
Sports venues completed in 2014